Michael Denis Edmond (born 30 July 1969) is a former English cricketer. Edmond was a right-handed batsman who bowled right-arm medium pace. He was born at Barrow-in-Furness, Lancashire.

Edmond made his first-class debut for Warwickshire against Middlesex in the 1996 County Championship. He made seven further first-class appearances for the county, the last of which came against Oxford University in 1999. In his total of eight first-class matches, he scored 138 runs at an average of 19.71, with a high score of 32.  With the ball, he took 7 wickets at a bowling average of 53.14, with best figures of 2/26.  He also made his List A debut in his debut season against Yorkshire in the 1996 AXA Equity & Law League. He made ten further List A appearances, the last of which came against Gloucestershire in the 1999 CGU National League.  In his eleven List A matches, he scored a total of 58 runs at an average of 14.50, with a high score of 19.  With the ball, he took 14 wickets at a bowling average of 19.57, with best figures of 2/4.

References

External links
Michael Edmond at ESPNcricinfo
Michael Edmond at CricketArchive

1969 births
Living people
Sportspeople from Barrow-in-Furness
Cricketers from Cumbria
English cricketers
Warwickshire cricketers